Divinization may refer to:
 Apotheosis, the glorification of a subject to divine level
 Divinization (Christian), a transformative process whose aim is likeness to or union with God
 Theosis (Eastern Christian theology), a transformative process whose aim is likeness to or union with God